"Knockout game" is a term used in the United States to describe a purportedly related series of street assaults.  

Knockout game may also refer to:

 Knock Out (tabletop game), a tabletop game by the Milton Bradley Company
 Knockout, a variation of basketball
 One-game playoff (also knockout), a tiebreaker in certain sports

See also 
 Knockout (disambiguation)